Liu Wei may refer to:

 Liu Wei (born 1958) (born 1958), Chinese politician
 Liu Wei (born 1965) (born 1965), Chinese politician
 Liu Wei (businessman) (born 1969), executed Chinese crime boss
 Liu Wei (artist) (born 1972), Chinese artist
 Liu Wei (pianist) (born 1987), Chinese amputee pianist

Sportspeople
 Liu Wei (cyclist) (born 1967), Chinese cyclist
 Liu Wei (table tennis) (born 1969), Chinese table tennis player
 Liu Wei (basketball) (born 1980), Chinese basketball player
 Liu Wei (curler) (born 1984), Chinese wheelchair curler
 Liu Wei (boxer) (born 1987), Chinese boxer
 Liu Wei (footballer) (born 1993), Chinese footballer